The Very Best of Eddie Cochran may refer to:

 The Very Best of Eddie Cochran (2008 album)
 The Very Best of Eddie Cochran (1975 album)